Roter Sand is a lighthouse in the North Sea, in the Weser estuary. It entered service in 1885. The light was deactivated in 1986 but the tower still serves as a day beacon. Roter Sand Lighthouse was the first building ever to be erected directly on the sea floor.

On 1 October 2010, the structure was awarded the title "Historical Monument of Engineering in Germany" (Historisches Wahrzeichen der Ingenieurbaukunst in Deutschland) by the Federal Chamber of Engineers.

Description 

The foundation is cylindrical and protrudes  from the sea at low tide. The tower above is conical. It is painted with red and white bands above a black base. The order of colours is white-red-white-red-white whereby the coloured section also marks the five floors inside the tower. The entrance is located at the lower rim of the lowest white band.

The basement serves as a storage. A stairway leads from there to the sleeping room. Further up is the kitchen with a coal-heated oven, and a living and service room. The latter has three oriel windows, two of which have the same height as the room itself while the third one leads even higher. The oriels used to host minor lights and point towards North-west, South and North-east. From the service room, a balcony around the lantern can be reached via a stairway. However, it is not possible to walk all around the lantern because the higher oriel window blocks one part of the balcony.

During the 1940s, the rooms used to be different with the inside of the black sector being accessible as storage. At the entrance level, there used to be the equipment for the generation of electrical power.

Tourism 
Day trips to the lighthouse, from Bremerhaven via the vessel "Lev Taifun", can be taken in June, July, and August. Staying overnight is also possible.

See also 

 List of lighthouses in Germany

References

External links 
 
 

Lighthouses completed in 1885
Lighthouses in Lower Saxony
North Sea